The Department of Rapid Transit Systems (DRTS) is a New Taipei City Government branch established in 2013 which oversees the construction and regulation of the Taipei Metro system in New Taipei along with DORTS (Taipei), while the Taipei Rapid Transit Corporation handles the running and maintenance of the system.

Planned lines
The following lines are currently in the planning stages:

References

Public transportation in Taiwan
2013 establishments in Taiwan
Government of New Taipei